Jamie Lundmark (born January 16, 1981) is a Canadian former professional ice hockey forward. A first-round draft pick of the New York Rangers, Lundmark played 295 games in the National Hockey League (NHL).

Playing career
As a youth, Lundmark played in the 1995 Quebec International Pee-Wee Hockey Tournament with a minor ice hockey team from the Whitemud area of Edmonton.

Lundmark played junior hockey with the Alberta Junior Hockey League's St. Albert Saints and the Seattle Thunderbirds. Drafted in the first round, 9th overall by the New York Rangers in the 1999 NHL Entry Draft out of the Moose Jaw Warriors, Lundmark played in the NHL with the Rangers, Phoenix Coyotes, Calgary Flames, Los Angeles Kings and Toronto Maple Leafs, as well as multiple teams in the American Hockey League (AHL). He played in Italy during the 2004–05 NHL lockout.

On January 29, 2007, he was traded along with two draft picks by the Flames to the Kings in exchange for former Flame Craig Conroy.

On July 27, 2007, Lundmark signed a one-year contract with HC Dynamo Moscow of the Russian Super League. In December, 2007, Lundmark left Dynamo Moscow and returned to North America, joining the Lake Erie Monsters of the AHL.

On July 16, 2008, Lundmark was signed to a one-year, two-way deal by the Calgary Flames.

On February 13, 2010, Lundmark was claimed off waivers from Calgary by the Maple Leafs. A month later Lundmark scored his first goal as a member of the Maple Leafs in a 6-4 victory against the Edmonton Oilers on March 13, 2010.

On July 16, 2010, Lundmark signed as a free agent to a one-year, two-way contract with the Nashville Predators. Suffering an injury at the Predators training camp ahead of the 2010–11 season, he was later assigned to AHL affiliate, the Milwaukee Admirals. After 34 games with the Admirals, Lundmark left for Europe to sign with Swedish team, Timrå IK, for the remainder of the season on January 10, 2011.

On August 22, 2011, Lundmark was signed to a free agent deal with Latvian club Dinamo Riga of the Kontinental Hockey League (KHL). Marking his second stint in the top Russian league, Lundmark contributed with 16 points in 47 games to help Riga qualify for the playoffs.

In the off-season, Lumndmark left Riga for Austria, signing a one-year contract with EC KAC of the Austrian Hockey League (EBEL). During the 2012–13 season, in which he guided Klagenfurt to the championship as their leading scorer and won the Ron Kennedy Trophy as the EBEL Most Valuable Player, he signed a two-year contract extension on March 7, 2013. In April 2015, he was handed another contract extension through the 2016–17 season.

Lundmark announced his retirement from professional hockey on March 20, 2018.

Career statistics

Regular season and playoffs

International

Awards and honours

References

External links

1981 births
Abbotsford Heat players
Calgary Flames players
Canadian ice hockey centres
Dinamo Riga players
HC Dynamo Moscow players
EC KAC players
Lake Erie Monsters players
Living people
Los Angeles Kings players
Milwaukee Admirals players
Moose Jaw Warriors players
National Hockey League first-round draft picks
New York Rangers draft picks
New York Rangers players
Phoenix Coyotes players
Quad City Flames players
St. Albert Saints players
San Antonio Rampage players
Seattle Thunderbirds players
Ice hockey people from Edmonton
Timrå IK players
Toronto Maple Leafs players
Canadian people of Swedish descent
Canadian expatriate ice hockey players in Austria
Canadian expatriate ice hockey players in Latvia
Canadian expatriate ice hockey players in Russia
Canadian expatriate ice hockey players in Sweden